Cape Healy is a prominent, square-shaped rock cape forming the north side of the entrance to Lamplugh Inlet, on the east coast of Palmer Land, Antarctica. It was discovered by members of the United States Antarctic Service (USAS) who explored this coast by land and from the air in 1940, and was named for Joseph D. Healy, a member of the Byrd Antarctic Expedition, 1933–35, and a dog driver at the USAS East Base, 1939–41.

References

Headlands of Palmer Land